Chad Hartigan (born August 31, 1982 in Nicosia, Cyprus) is a Cyprus-born, Irish-American filmmaker and actor.

Early life

Chad Hartigan was born in Nicosia, Cyprus in 1982. His father is from Limerick, Ireland, and his mother is from Sparks, Nevada. They were both missionaries who met at a YWAM camp in England and got married there before relocating to Cyprus.

The family moved to the United States in 1995 and Chad attended Tallwood High School in Virginia Beach, becoming heavily involved in theater and video production. He graduated and was accepted to the one and only college he applied for, the North Carolina School of the Arts. He attended the filmmaking program there and graduated in 2004 with a BFA in directing and was roommates with Aaron Katz.

Career

His first feature as director, Luke and Brie Are on a First Date, premiered at the Hamptons International Film Festival in 2008 and went on to spawn an Argentine remake in 2013 called Luna en Leo which was nominated for Best Adapted Screenplay by the Argentine Academy of Cinematography Arts and Sciences Awards.

His second feature, This Is Martin Bonner, premiered at the Sundance Film Festival in 2013 where it won the Best of NEXT Audience Award. It was also screened at the 2013 Karlovy Vary International Film Festival, Stockholm International Film Festival, and Torino Film Festival among many others. In 2014, it was awarded the John Cassavetes Award at the Film Independent Spirit Awards.

In 2014, he returned to the Karlovy Vary International Film Festival to serve on the Independent Camera jury.

His third feature, Morris from America, premiered at the 2016 Sundance Film Festival in the U.S. Dramatic Competition where Hartigan was awarded the Waldo Salt Screenwriting Award, and was released by A24 Films. It was nominated for a Gotham Award, an Independent Spirit Award and named one of the top 10 independent films of the year by the National Board of Review.

In 2017, he directed an episode of the HBO series Room 104.

His fourth feature, and first that he didn't write or co-write, was Little Fish. It was filmed in 2019 and scheduled for release in 2020 before being delayed by the COVID-19 pandemic. IFC Films released the film in February 2021 to critical acclaim.

Filmography
Luke and Brie Are on a First Date (2008)
This Is Martin Bonner (2013)
Morris from America (2016)
Little Fish (2021)

External links
 "Luke and Brie Are on a First Date" Myspace Page

1982 births
Cypriot actors
Cypriot emigrants to the United States
Cypriot screenwriters
Film directors from Virginia
Living people
Male actors from Virginia
People from Nicosia
People from Virginia Beach, Virginia
Screenwriters from Virginia
University of North Carolina alumni